This is a list of districts in the London Borough of Harrow.

The whole borough is covered within the HA postcode area, except one small residential street in Queensbury, Honey Close, which is NW9 thus the NW postcode area.

Neighbourhoods

Electoral wards
Belmont, Canons, Greenhill, Harrow on the Hill, Harrow Weald, Hatch End, Headstone North, Headstone South, Kenton East, Kenton West, Marlborough, Pinner, Pinner South, Queensbury, Rayners Lane, Roxbourne, Roxeth, Stanmore Park, Wealdstone, West Harrow.

See also 
Harrow parks and open spaces

 
Lists of places in London